Matthew David Gumley (born February 7, 1997 in West Palm Beach, Florida) is an American actor.

Broadway productions
Elf Original Cast (2010–2011, as Michael)
Addams Family Original Cast (2010, as Ancestor, u/s Pugsley Addams)
Mary Poppins Original Cast (2006–2008, as Michael Banks)
Beauty and the Beast (2004–2005, as Chip)

Filmography

Television
 Nella the Princess Knight (2017–2021) - Clod (voice)
 Dora the Explorer (2008–2012) - Benny (voice)
 Yu-Gi-Oh! Sevens (2022) - Lucidien "Luke" Kallister (voice)

Film
 Theresa Is a Mother (2012) - Seth Nerwitz
 Beer League (2006) - Tommy

Video games
 Yu-Gi-Oh! Rush Duel: Dawn of the Battle Royale (2021) - Luke (Lucidien Kallister)
 Grand Theft Auto IV (2008) - Zachary Tyler
 Thrillville (2006) - Child Male 3

TV guest appearances
The Americans playing Rich in episode "The Oath" (2013)
Modern Family playing Jimmy Scrivano in episode "Dude Ranch" (2011)
Psych playing Mason in episode "Shawn Saves Darth Vader" (2011)
Law & Order: Special Victims Unit playing Boy in episode "Bullseye" (2010)
Wonder Pets playing the voice of the Mouse King in episode "Save the Mouse King" (2008)
Wonder Pets playing the voice of the Pangaroo in episode "Save the Pangaroo" (2007)
Law & Order: Special Victims Unit playing Joe in episode "Cage" (2006)
Drake & Josh playing Young Josh Nichols in episode "Foam Finger" (2005)
The Daily Show playing Gene Kelly in episode "dated 13 July 2005" (2005)
All My Children playing Scooter in episode "1.9033" (2005)
In Search Of playing Young Tom in episode "Alien Menace" (2002)

References

External links

1997 births
Living people
American male child actors
American male film actors
American male musical theatre actors
American male television actors
American male voice actors
People from West Palm Beach, Florida